Cantrainea peloritana is a species of sea snail, a marine gastropod mollusk in the family Colloniidae.

Description
The height of the shell varies between 5 mm and 20 mm. 

C. peloritana lives in the bathyal zone at depths between 545m and 1300m. In the Mediterranean it lives on white coral and in the Atlantic it lives on sand or gravel.

It feeds by eating detritus and grazing.

Distribution
This marine species occurs in the Bay of Biscayne and in the Mediterranean Sea.

References

External links
 

Colloniidae
Gastropods described in 1835